Italy and the United States enjoy warm and friendly relations. The United States has had diplomatic representation in the nation of Italy and its predecessor nation, the Kingdom of Italy, since 1840. However, in 1891 the Italian government severed diplomatic relations and briefly contemplated war against the US as a response to the unresolved case of the lynching of eleven Italians in New Orleans, Louisiana, and there was a break in relations from 1941 to 1943, while Italy and the United States were at war.

After World War II, Italy became a strong and active transatlantic partner which, along with the United States, has sought to foster democratic ideals and international cooperation in areas of strife and civil conflict. Toward this end, the Italian government has cooperated with the United States in the formulation of defense, security, and peacekeeping policies.
Under longstanding bilateral agreements flowing from NATO membership, Italy hosts important U.S. military forces at Vicenza and Livorno (army); Aviano (air force); and Sigonella, Gaeta, and Naples—home port for the U.S. Navy Sixth Fleet. The United States has about 11,500 military personnel stationed in Italy. Italy hosts the NATO Defense College in Rome.

In addition to close governmental, economic and cultural ties, according to Pew Research global opinion polls, Italy is one of the most pro-American nations in the world, with 70% of Italians viewing the United States favorably in 2002, increasing to 78% in 2014. According to the 2012 U.S. Global Leadership Report, 51% of Italians approved of U.S. leadership under the Obama Administration, with 16% disapproving and 33% uncertain. On the other side, many Americans also hold a favorable view of Italy, with over 70–80% Americans viewing Italy as a favorite country.

History

18th, 19th, and early 20th Century
Before 1861, no singular Italian nation state existed. The Italian Peninsula was instead divided among several smaller states, each of which the United States established diplomatic relations with. Many of these smaller Italian states were among the first countries in the world to recognize the independence of and maintain diplomatic relations with the United States. For example, the Republic of Genoa officially recognized U.S. independence in 1792 and consular relations were established with the Papal States in 1797. During the Risorgimento, the smaller states inhabiting the Italian Peninsula unified to form the Kingdom of Italy. The United States officially recognized the Kingdom of Italy on April 11, 1861.

During the First Barbary War (1801-1805), the United States was allied with the Kingdom of Sicily against the Barbary corsairs due to a shared interest by both countries in putting an end to the disruption of trade on the Mediterranean Sea caused by the corsairs.

Both Italy and the United States were part of the Eight-Nation Alliance that intervened in the Boxer Rebellion in China from 1899 to 1901.

From the 1880s to 1920, more than 4 million Italians emigrated to the United States and accounted for more than 10 percent of the country's foreign-born population. Italian Americans faced rampant hostility and discrimination due in large part to being Catholic in a majority Protestant nation with a long history of anti-Catholic sentiment. Italian immigration to the United States tapered off in the 1920s largely because of passage of the Immigration Act of 1924, which caused Italian immigration to fall more than 90 percent.

After the deaths of 11 Italians during a mass lynching in 1891, relations between the nations were strained. The Italian government demanded that the lynch mob be brought to justice and reparations be paid to the dead men's families. When the U.S. declined to prosecute the mob leaders, Italy recalled its ambassador from Washington in protest. The U.S. followed suit, recalling its delegation from Rome. Diplomatic relations remained at an impasse for over a year. When President Benjamin Harrison agreed to pay a $25,000 indemnity to the victims' families, Congress tried unsuccessfully to intervene, accusing him of "unconstitutional executive usurpation of Congressional powers".

The rise of fascism and World War II

The United States and Italy were both members of the Allied Powers during World War I, and President Woodrow Wilson visited Rome while traveling to the Paris Peace Conference. However, at the Conference President Woodrow Wilson opposed Italian irredentist war aims guaranteed in the secret Treaty of London, which ran counter to his 14 Points demanding "open diplomacy" and self-determination. In protest of Wilson and the other Allied leaders' refusal to recognize territorial demands in Yugoslavia and Albania, the Italian delegation under Prime Minister Vittorio Orlando and Foreign Minister Sidney Sonnino walked out of the conference. Wilson tried to mollify the situation by issuing a direct appeal to the Italian people in Le Temps, but it was widely derided by the Italian public.

Since Mussolini's rise to power the United States applauded him on his early achievements, including helping with relations between the two countries. Relations deteriorated after Italy invaded Ethiopia. This was about the time the United States started practicing isolationism.

From 1941 to 1943 Italy was at war with the United States. From 1943 till the end of the war the only part of Italy at war with the United States was the German puppet state the Italian Social Republic. Italian Partisans and Victor Emmanuel III and his loyalists from 1943 and onward helped the United States and other Allies during the Italian Campaign of World War II. When the War ended the United States occupied Italy until its plebiscite on the institutional form of the State. The United States helped with the transition from a monarchy to a republic in 1946. Since then, Italy has become an ally of the United States and a buffer against the spread of communism in Europe.

1946–1989

From 1946 to 1953, Italy became a Republic (1946), signed a Peace Treaty with the Allies (1947), a member of the North Atlantic Treaty Organization (NATO) in 1949 and an ally of the United States, which helped to revive the Italian economy through the Marshall Plan. In the same years, Italy also became a member of the European Coal and Steel Community (ECSC), which eventually transformed into the European Union (EU).

Christian Democrat Prime Minister Alcide De Gasperi (1945–1953) enjoyed considerable support in the US, where he was seen as the man who could oppose the rising tide of Communism – in particular the Italian Communist Party, which was the biggest communist party in a Western European democracy. In January 1947 he visited the US. The chief goals of the trip were to soften the terms of the pending peace treaty with Italy, and to obtain immediate economic assistance. His ten-day tour, engineered by media mogul Henry Luce – the owner of Time Magazine – and his wife Clare Boothe Luce the future ambassador to Rome, was viewed as a media "triumph," prompting positive comments of a wide section of the American press.

During his meetings in the U.S., he managed to secure a financially modest but politically significant US$100 million Eximbank loan to Italy. According to De Gasperi, public opinion would view the loan as a vote of confidence in the Italian Government and strengthen his position versus the Communist Party in the context of the emerging Cold War. The positive results strengthened De Gasperi's reputation in Italy. He also came back with useful information on the incipient change in American foreign policy that would lead to the Cold War and in Italy the break with the Communists and left-wing Socialists and their removal from the government in the May 1947 crisis.

Italy faced political instability in the 1970s, which ended in the 1980s. Known as the Years of Lead, this period was characterized by widespread social conflicts and terrorist acts carried out by extra-parliamentary movements. The assassination of the leader of the Christian Democracy (DC), Aldo Moro, led to the end of a "historic compromise" between the DC and the Communist Party (PCI). In the 1980s, for the first time, two governments were managed by a republican (Giovanni Spadolini) and a socialist (Bettino Craxi) rather than by a member of DC.

Many aspects of the Years of Lead are still shrouded in mystery and debate about them continues. There were many, especially on the left, who spoke of the existence in those years of a strategy of tension (strategia della tensione). According to this theory, occult and foreign forces were involved in creating a "strategy of tension". Identified organizations included: Gladio, a NATO secret anti-communist structure; the P2 masonic lodge, discovered in 1981 following the arrest of its leader Licio Gelli; neo-fascist "black terrorism" organizations such as Ordine Nuovo or Avanguardia Nazionale; Italian secret service; and the United States. This theory re-emerged in the 1990s, following Prime Minister Giulio Andreotti's recognition of the existence of Gladio before the Parliamentary assembly on 24 October 1990. Juridical investigations into the Piazza Fontana bombing and the Bologna massacre and several parliamentary reports pointed towards such a deliberate strategy of tension. Milan prosecutor Guido Salvini indicted a U.S. Navy officer, David Carrett, for his role in the Piazza Fontana bombing. He also surprised Carlo Rocchi, a CIA operative in Italy, in 1995 while searching for information concerning the case in the mid-1990s. In 2000, a Parliamentary Commission report from the then center-left government, concluded that the strategy of tension had been supported by the United States to "stop the PCI, and to a certain degree also the PSI, from reaching executive power in the country".

With the end of the Years of lead (Italy) (1969-1989), the Italian Communist Party gradually increased its votes under the leadership of Enrico Berlinguer. The Socialist party (PSI), partner of Christian Democrats and led by Prime Minister Bettino Craxi, became more and more critical of the communists and of the Soviet Union; Craxi himself pushed in favour of US president Ronald Reagan's positioning of Pershing II missiles in Italy, a move the communists hotly contested. After the fall of the Berlin Wall, Italy faced significant challenges, as voters, disenchanted with past political paralysis, massive government debt and an extensive corruption system (collectively called Tangentopoli after being uncovered by the 'Clean Hands' investigation ), demanded political, economic, and ethical reforms. The scandals involved all major parties, but especially those in the government coalition: between 1992 and 1994 the Christian Democrats underwent a severe crisis and was dissolved, splitting up into several pieces, while also the Socialists and the other governing minor parties also dissolved. The Communists reorganized as a social-democratic force.

Post 1989

During the 1990s and 2000s, the United States and Italy have always cooperated as NATO partners on issues like the Gulf War, Lebanon, the Middle East peace process, multilateral talks, Somalia and Mozambique peacekeeping, drug trafficking, trafficking in women and children, and terrorism. Under longstanding bilateral agreements flowing from NATO membership, Italy hosts important U.S. military forces at Vicenza and Livorno (army); Aviano (air force); and Sigonella, Gaeta, and Naples–home port for the United States Sixth Fleet. The United States has about 13,000 military personnel stationed in Italy. Italy hosts the NATO Defence College in Rome. Italy remains a strong and active transatlantic partner which, along with the United States, has sought to foster democratic ideals and international cooperation in areas of strife and civil conflict.

During the 2000s, Berlusconi and his cabinets have had a strong tendency to support American foreign policies, despite the policy divide between the U.S. and many founding members of the European Union (Germany, France, and Belgium) during the Bush administration. Under his lead the Italian Government also shifted its traditional position on foreign policy from being the most pro-Arab western government towards a greater friendship with Israel and Turkey. Italy, with Berlusconi in office, became a solid ally of the United States due to his support in the War in Afghanistan and the Iraq War following the 2003 invasion of Iraq in the War on Terror. Silvio Berlusconi, in his meetings with United Nations Secretary-General Kofi Annan and U.S. President George W. Bush, said that he pushed for "a clear turnaround in the Iraqi situation" and for a quick handover of sovereignty to the government chosen by the Iraqi people. The Italian Armed Forces had some 3,200 troops deployed in Southern Iraq, the third largest contingent there after the American and British forces. Italian troops were gradually withdrawn from Iraq in the second half of 2006 with the last soldiers leaving the country in December of the same year.

During his second center-left government from 2006 to 2008, Prime Minister Romano Prodi laid out some sense of his new foreign policy when he pledged to withdraw Italian troops from Iraq and called the Iraq War a "grave mistake that has not solved but increased the problem of security".

Resident diplomatic missions
 Italy has an embassy in Washington, D.C. and consulates-general in Boston, Chicago, Houston, Los Angeles, Miami, New York City, Philadelphia and San Francisco and a consulate in Detroit.
 United States has an embassy in Rome and consulates-general in Florence, Milan and Naples.

See also
 CIA activities in Italy
 Foreign relations of the United States
 Foreign relations of Italy
 United States Ambassador to Italy
List of ambassadors of Italy to the United States
 Italy–USA Foundation
 Italian language in the United States
 List of Italian-American neighborhoods
 Italian Americans

References

Further reading
 Brogi, Alessandro. "Ike and Italy: The Eisenhower Administration and Italy's 'Neo-Atlanticist' Agenda." Journal of Cold War Studies 4.3 (2002): 5-35.
 Brogi, Alessandro. "Ambassador Clare Boothe Luce and the evolution of psychological warfare in Italy." Cold War History 12.2 (2012): 269–294.
 Brogi, Alessandro. A question of self-esteem: the United States and the Cold War choices in France and Italy, 1944-1958 (Greenwood, 2002) 
 Brogi, Alessandro. Confronting America: The Cold War between the United States and the Communists in France and Italy  (2012) 

 Cosco, Joseph P. Imagining Italians: The Clash of Romance and Race in American Perceptions, 1880-1910 (SUNY Press, 2012)
Gambino, Richard. Vendetta: The True Story of the Largest Lynching in U.S. History (Guernica Editions, 2000)
 Hughes, H. Stuart. The United States and Italy (Harvard University Press, 1965) online
 Migone, Gian Giacomo. The United States and Fascist Italy: The Rise of American Finance in Europe (Cambridge University Press, 2015).

 Miller, James Edward. The United States and Italy, 1940-1950: the politics and diplomacy of stabilization (University of North Carolina Press, 1986) 
 Mistry, Kaeten. "The case for political warfare: Strategy, organization and US involvement in the 1948 Italian election." Cold War History 6.3 (2006): 301–329.
 Mistry, Kaeten. "Re-thinking American intervention in the 1948 Italian election: beyond a success–failure dichotomy." Modern Italy 16.2 (2011): 179–194.
 Pells, Richard. Not like Us: How Europeans Have Loved, Hated and Transformed American Culture since World War II (1997) online

 Rabel, Roberto Giorgio. Between East and West: Trieste, the United States, and the Cold War, 1941-1954 (Duke University Press, 1988)
 Schmitz, David F. The United States and fascist Italy, 1922-1940 (1988)  online
 Wollemborg, Leo J. Stars, Stripes, and Italian Tricolor: The United States and Italy, 1946-1989 (1990)

External links
History of Italy - U.S. relations

 
United States
Bilateral relations of the United States